Karol Baran (born 16 August 1981) is a speedway rider from Poland.

Speedway career
He rode in the top tier of British Speedway riding for the Poole Pirates during the 2009 Elite League speedway season. He began his British career riding for Ipswich Witches in 2005.

References 

1981 births
Living people
Polish speedway riders
Ipswich Witches riders
Poole Pirates riders